Liberty Chakoroma (born 28 February 1994) is a Zimbabwean footballer who plays as a defender for Chicken Inn F.C. and the Zimbabwe national football team.

He played in the 2013 COSAFA U-20 Cup, scoring against Botswana. He also played with the under-23 squad in the 2015 African Games.

References

External links

1994 births
Living people
Zimbabwean footballers
Zimbabwe international footballers
Zimbabwe under-20 international footballers
Sportspeople from Mutare
Association football defenders
Buffaloes F.C. players
Free State Stars F.C. players
Ngezi Platinum F.C. players
Chicken Inn F.C. players
Zimbabwe Premier Soccer League players
South African Premier Division players
Competitors at the 2015 African Games
Zimbabwean expatriate footballers
Expatriate soccer players in South Africa
Zimbabwean expatriate sportspeople in South Africa
African Games competitors for Zimbabwe